is a passenger railway station in located in the city of  Hirakata, Osaka Prefecture, Japan, operated by the private railway company Keihan Electric Railway.

Lines
Kuzuha Station is served by the  Keihan Main Line, and is located 27.7 km from the starting point of the line at Yodoyabashi Station.

Station layout
The station has two elevated island platforms with the station building underneath.

Platforms

Adjacent stations

Starting only: Semi-Express (区間急行)
Terminating only: Midnight Express (深夜急行) (arriving at 0:50 a.m.)

History
April 15, 1910 - Station opens as the Keihan Main Line begins operation.
June 20, 1971 - Station moves about 300 meters towards Osaka to the present location. Promoted to an express stop.
April 1, 1972 - Keihan opens Kuzuha Mall shopping center in front of the station.
September 6, 2003 - Promoted to a limited express stop.

Passenger statistics
In fiscal 2019, the station was used by an average of 60,402 passengers daily.

Surrounding area
KUZUHA MALL
Osaka Dental University Kuzuha Campus
Keihan Bus terminal

See also 
List of railway stations in Japan

References

External links

Official home page 

Railway stations in Osaka Prefecture
Railway stations in Japan opened in 1910
Hirakata, Osaka